Gandhi: The Years That Changed the World, 1914-1948 is a non-fiction book by Indian historian Ramachandra Guha (born 1958) published by Penguin Random House in September 2018. One of the most extensive biography on the sole icon of the Indian independence movement Mahatma Gandhi, it has garnered wide recognition and accolades. The book runs in excess of 1100 pages. It is a standalone sequel of the 2013 book Gandhi Before India.

References

2018 non-fiction books
Books about Mahatma Gandhi
Allen Lane (imprint) books